Oxfordshire Artweeks is an annual art festival held in Oxfordshire, England for three weeks each May.

Exhibitions are held in the city of Oxford, south Oxfordshire, and north Oxfordshire, for a week each on consecutive weeks. Venues vary from houses of local artists to art galleries such as Art Jericho. The festival was established in 1981.

References

External links
 Oxfordshire Artweeks website

1981 establishments in England
Recurring events established in 1981
Festivals in Oxfordshire
Arts festivals in England
Art festivals in the United Kingdom
May events
English contemporary art